Established in 1816, the Office of the Attorney General of Norway is the legal advisor to the government. The attorney general assists the executive branch of government with judicial questions and to conduct civil legal trials. The office is a body subordinate to the Norwegian Office of the Prime Minister.

The Director of Public Prosecutions of Norway is the head of the Norwegian Prosecuting Authority, an independent government agency subordinate only to "King-in-Council" (Council of State (Norway)). The Judge Advocate General of Norway is the head of the military prosecution authority, and is subordinate to riksadvokaten.

The office has 46 employees (of whom 34 are legal professionals). The current Attorney General of Norway is Fredrik Sejersted, whereas the assisting Attorney General is Tolle Stabell. The headquarters are in Oslo.

List of attorneys general of Norway
This is a list of the heads of the Office of the Attorney General of Norway:

 1816–1820 : Bredo Henrik von Munthe af Morgenstierne, Sr.
 1820–1825 : Jonas Anton Hielm
 1822–1830 : Niels Aars
 1830–1837 : H. C. Petersen
 1837–1839 : Frederik Stang
 1839–1842 : Eskild Bruun
 1842–1859 : I. W. Skjelderup
 1859–1870 : Bernhard Dunker
 1870–1873 : H. C. H. Grønn
 1873–1893 : Christian Lasson
 1893–1904 : Johannes Bergh
 1904–1917 : Karl Lous
 1917–1923 : Annæus J. Schjødt
 1924–1939 : Kristen Johanssen
 1939–1941 : Valentin Voss
 1941–1945 : German occupation of Norway
 1945–1962 : Henning Bødtker
 1962–1972 : Hans Methlie Michelsen
 1972–1993 : Bjørn Haug
 1993–2015 : Sven Ole Fagernæs
 2015-present : Fredrik Sejersted

References

Law of Norway
Government of Norway
Organisations based in Oslo
1816 establishments in Norway
Organizations established in 1816